Elections to Derry City Council were held on 17 May 1989 on the same day as the other Northern Irish local government elections. The election used five district electoral areas to elect a total of 30 councillors.

Election results

Note: "Votes" are the first preference votes.

Districts summary

|- class="unsortable" align="centre"
!rowspan=2 align="left"|Ward
! % 
!Cllrs
! % 
!Cllrs
! %
!Cllrs
! %
!Cllrs
! % 
!Cllrs
! % 
!Cllrs
!rowspan=2|TotalCllrs
|- class="unsortable" align="center"
!colspan=2 bgcolor="" | SDLP
!colspan=2 bgcolor="" | Sinn Féin
!colspan=2 bgcolor="" | DUP
!colspan=2 bgcolor="" | UUP
!colspan=2 bgcolor="" | UDP
!colspan=2 bgcolor="white"| Others
|-
|align="left"|Cityside
|bgcolor="#99FF66"|51.7
|bgcolor="#99FF66"|3
|42.2
|3
|0.0
|0
|0.0
|0
|0.0
|0
|6.1
|0
|6
|-
|align="left"|Northland
|bgcolor="#99FF66"|67.1
|bgcolor="#99FF66"|4
|18.8
|1
|0.0
|0
|6.9
|0
|0.0
|0
|7.2
|1
|6
|-
|align="left"|Rural
|bgcolor="#99FF66"|41.4
|bgcolor="#99FF66"|3
|0.0
|0
|25.1
|2
|23.4
|2
|3.8
|0
|6.3
|0
|7
|-
|align="left"|Shantallow
|bgcolor="#99FF66"|73.8
|bgcolor="#99FF66"|4
|21.9
|1
|0.0
|0
|0.0
|0
|0.0
|0
|4.3
|0
|5
|-
|align="left"|Waterside
|19.7
|1
|8.1
|0
|bgcolor="#D46A4C"|36.0
|bgcolor="#D46A4C"|2
|15.0
|1
|8.3
|1
|12.9
|1
|6
|-
|- class="unsortable" class="sortbottom" style="background:#C9C9C9"
|align="left"| Total
|49.7
|15
|16.4
|5
|13.5
|4
|10.2
|3
|2.6
|1
|7.6
|2
|30
|-
|}

District results

Cityside

1985: 3 x SDLP, 3 x Sinn Féin
1989: 3 x SDLP, 3 x Sinn Féin
1985-1989 Change: No change

Northland

1985: 3 x SDLP, 1 x Sinn Féin, 1 x UUP, 1 x IIP
1989: 4 x SDLP, 1 x Sinn Féin, 1 x Independent Unionist
1985-1989 Change: SDLP gain from IIP, Independent Unionist leaves UUP

Rural

1985: 3 x SDLP, 2 x DUP, 2 x UUP
1989: 3 x SDLP, 2 x DUP, 2 x UUP
1985-1989 Change: No change

Shantallow

1985: 4 x SDLP, 1 x Sinn Féin
1989: 4 x SDLP, 1 x Sinn Féin
1985-1989 Change: No change

Waterside

1985: 3 x DUP, 2 x UUP, 1 x SDLP
1989: 2 x DUP, 1 x UUP, 1 x SDLP, 1 x UDP, 1 x Independent Unionist
1985-1989 Change: UDP gain from DUP, Independent Unionist leaves UUP

References

Derry City Council elections
Derry